Jagin-e Bala (also Romanized as Jagīn-e Bālā; also known as Jagin) is a village in Gabrik Rural District, in the Central District of Jask County, Hormozgan Province, Iran. At the 2006 census, its population was 170, in 46 families.

References 

Populated places in Jask County